Gerani is a village and a community situated in the municipality of Platanias, Crete, Greece. The Gerani beach is awarded with the Blue Flag. There plenty of traditional tavernas, car rental companies, supermarkets and hotels in the village.

References

Populated places in Chania (regional unit)